Through the Valley of the Kwai (also published under the titles Miracle on the River Kwai and To End All Wars) is the autobiography of the Scottish captain Ernest Gordon, and recounts the experiences of faith and hope of the men held in a Japanese prisoner of war labour camp, building the Burma Railway during World War II.

Dusty Miller
Dusty Miller was a British prisoner of war (POW) in Thailand conscripted to work on the Burma Railway during the last three and a half years of World War II. His life and death is attested to in Gordon's book.  Miller was a gardener from Newcastle and a Methodist. Like Gordon, he was in the Argyll and Sutherland Highlanders, but was drafted into the Military Police or "Red Caps".  He became known to Ernest Gordon during a period early on in their three and a half year incarceration under the Japanese.  Gordon was seriously ill, and was attended to by Miller and "Dinty" Moore, a Roman Catholic POW.  In their care, Gordon unexpectedly recovered. Through the examples of Miller and Moore, the recovery of Gordon, and the self-sacrificing examples of numerous others, both faith and hope were restored to many soldiers in the death camps.

Death
At the war's end, Gordon was the sole survivor of the three. Upon liberation, as he sought news of his friends, he found that two weeks before the war's end Miller was martyred, having been crucified by a Japanese guard as a result of his faith.

Near the end of the war, Dinty Moore was being transferred on a Japanese ship, which should have had Red Cross markings, as it was a POW ship, not a warship. An Allied submarine sank the ship, not knowing it was a POW ship.

In popular culture
The book was also adapted into a film in 2001 under the title To End All Wars.

See also
 The Bridge over the River Kwai - a novel with a similar theme
 "Silence", the acclaimed historical novel by Shusaku Endo dealing with the history of Christianity in Japan.

References

External links
 Ernest Gordon's To End All Wars

British autobiographies
Memoirs of imprisonment